William Sulburge was an English medieval churchman and university Chancellor.

Sulburge was three times Chancellor of the University of Oxford during 1410–13.

References

Year of birth unknown
Year of death unknown
Chancellors of the University of Oxford
15th-century English people
15th-century English clergy